This is a list of events in Asia in 2016.

Events

January
January 1–2 killed in suicide bombing in Kabul, Afghanistan.
January 6 - January 2016 North Korean nuclear test
January 16 - 2016 Taiwanese presidential election

February
February 6 - 2016 Taiwan earthquake
February 17 - an attack in Ankara, Turkey caused at least 28 deaths.
February 26 - 2016 Iranian legislative election

March
March 4 - an attack in Aden caused at least 16 deaths.
March 13–37 killed in an attack in Ankara.
March 20
2016 Kazakhstani legislative election
2016 Laotian parliamentary election
March 31 - an attack in Diyarbakir kills seven police officers

April
April 13 - 2016 South Korean legislative election
April 14 and 16 - 2016 Kumamoto earthquakes
April 20 - Boungnang Vorachit is elected President of Laos; Thongloun Sisoulith appointed Prime Minister of Laos.

May
May 6 - opening of the seventh Congress of the party of labor of Korea.
May 9 - 2016 Philippine general election
May 22
2016 Tajikistani constitutional referendum
2016 Vietnamese legislative election
May 24 - Binali Yıldırım was appointed Prime Minister of Turkey.
May 26 and 27 - 42nd G7 summit

June
June 29 - 2016 Mongolian legislative election

July
July 10 - 2016 Japanese House of Councillors election
July 15 - 2016 Turkish coup d'état attempt
July 26 - Sagamihara stabbings
July 31 - Yuriko Koike is the first woman elected Governor of Tokyo.

August
August 7 - 2016 Thai constitutional referendum
August 11 and 12 - bombings in Hua Hin, Surat Thani, Phuket and Trang.
August 20 - more than 50 killed in a bombing in Gaziantep.
August 26 - bombing to Cizre against the police.
August 29 - an attack in Aden caused at least 71 dead.

September
September 4 - 2016 Hong Kong legislative election
September 7 and 8 - the 28th ASEAN Summit in Vientiane, Laos.
September 9 - fifth nuclear test in North Korea.
September 20 - 2016 Jordanian general election

October
October 13 - death of Bhumibol Adulyadejas, King of Thailand, known as the reign of Rama IX.

November
November 26 - 2016 Kuwaiti general election

December
December 1 - prince Vajiralongkorn is proclaimed King under the name of Rama X.
December 4 - 2016 Uzbekistani presidential election
December 11 - 2016 Kyrgyzstani constitutional referendum
December 17 - a Kayseri attack caused at least 14 deaths.
December 19 - the Ambassador of Russia Andrei Karlov was assassinated in Ankara.
December 20 - the Eurasia under the Bosphorus tunnel is opened in Istanbul.

References

 
Years of the 21st century in Asia
2010s in Asia